The second season of NCIS: New Orleans, an American police procedural drama television series, originally aired on CBS from September 22, 2015, through May 17, 2016. The season was produced by CBS Television Studios, with Gary Glasberg as showrunner and executive producer.

Plot
The second season of the NCIS: New Orleans once again follows the work of Special Agent Dwayne Pride, Chris LaSalle, Meredith Brody, and new team member Sonja Percy. Tasked with solving crimes involving the U.S. Navy and Marine Corps in the Crescent City, the team investigate the ambush of a Navy convoy ("Sic Semper Tyrannis"), a suspected war crime ("Shadow Unit"), the black-market sale of a military drone ("I Do"), and a murder at New Orleans' annual Red Dress run ("Insane in the Membrane"). Pride also works alongside an Australian Naval Investigator, who comes to New Orleans as part of a joint task force ("Foreign Affairs"), and Secretary Sarah Porter, as she oversees the inquiry into the crash of a new military jet ("Touched by the Sun"), while Brody's mother, Olivia, joins the team to track down an organ thief ("Broken Hearted"), and NCIS agents join their New Orleans counterparts when a family member is accused of murder ("Sister City, Part II").

Cast and characters

Main
 Scott Bakula as Dwayne Cassius Pride, NCIS Supervisory Special Agent (SSA) assigned to the New Orleans Office
 Lucas Black as Christopher LaSalle, NCIS Senior Field Agent, (SFA), second in command
 Zoe McLellan as Meredith Brody, NCIS Special Agent for the New Orleans Office
 Rob Kerkovich as Sebastian Lund, Jefferson Parish Forensic Specialist for NCIS
 Daryl "Chill" Mitchell as Patton Plame, Computer Specialist for NCIS
 Shalita Grant as Sonja Percy, NCIS Special Agent and Former ATF field Agent
 C. C. H. Pounder as Dr. Loretta Wade, Jefferson Parish Medical Examiner for NCIS

Recurring
 Christopher Meyer as Danny Malloy, Loretta's eldest foster son (C.J.'s brother)
 Shanley Caswell as Laurel Pride, Dwayne Pride's daughter
 Steven Weber as Douglas Hamilton, New Orleans city councilman of District C and later Mayor of New Orleans (R)

Guests
 Leslie Hope as Sarah Porter, Secretary of the Navy
 Kate Beahan as Naomi Parsons, Australian Defence Force Investigative Service agent and love interest of Dwayne Pride
 Benjamin Papac as Max "PinZ0" Pinzon
 Annie Potts as Olivia Brody
 Dani Dare as C.J. Malloy, Loretta's youngest foster son (Danny's brother)
 JC Gonzalez as Jake
 Emily Marie Palmer as Beth
 Rick Peters as Thomas Freeman  
 Erica Dasher as Sofia Freeman
 Daniel Francois as Alonzo Brown
 Mark Harmon as Leroy Jethro Gibbs, NCIS Senior Special Agent (SSA) assigned to Washington's Navy Yard 
 Pauley Perrette as Abigail Sciuto, Forensic Specialist attached to NCIS in D.C.
 Brian Dietzen as Jimmy Palmer, Assistant Medical Examiner for NCIS in D.C.
 Emily Wickersham as Eleanor Bishop, NCIS Special Agent in D.C.
 David McCallum as Dr. Donald Mallard, Chief Medical Examiner for NCIS in D.C.
 Tyler Ritter as Luca Sciuto, Abby's brother
 Cassidy Freeman as Eva Azarova
 Brian McNamara as Randy Wilson
 Jude Ciccolella as David Peterson, former Army Colonel (formerly Sec Nav in "original" NCIS)
 Ivan Sergei as John Russo
 Toni Trucks as  CGIS Agent Joan Swanson

Episodes

Production

Development
NCIS: New Orleans was renewed for a second season on January 12, 2015. This season featured a crossover with NCIS and NCIS: New Orleans with a two-part crossover episode. Scott Bakula, Lucas Black, Zoe McLellan, and Shalita Grant appeared as Dwayne Pride, Christopher LaSalle, Meredith "Merri" Brody, and Sonja Percy in the twelfth episode of the thirteen season of NCIS episode titled "Sister City (Part I)". The second part Mark Harmon, Pauley Perrette, Brian Dietzen, Emily Wickersham, and David McCallum appeared as Leroy Jethro Gibbs, Abby Sciuto, Jimmy Palmer, Ellie Bishop, and Dr. Donald Mallard in the twelfth episode of this season episode titled "Sister City, Part II" which aired on January 5, 2016. Tyler Ritter also guest stars as Luca Sciuto Abby's brother. NCIS: New Orleans was renewed for a third season on March 25, 2016.

Casting 
On June 19, 2015, Daryl Mitchell and Shalita Grant, who had been recurring cast, were promoted to series regulars.

Broadcast
Season two of NCIS: New Orleans, which premiered on September 22, 2015.

Reception

Ratings

References

General

External links
 
 

02
2015 American television seasons
2016 American television seasons